William Bolton was an English footballer who played as a winger. He played one match in the Football League for Burnley. He made his debut for Burnley in the 2–1 win over Newcastle United on 14 April 1915.

References

Year of birth unknown
Year of death unknown
English footballers
Association football wingers
Burnley F.C. players
English Football League players